Olney's lesions, also known as NMDA receptor antagonist neurotoxicity (NAN), are a form of potential brain damage due to drugs that have been studied experimentally and have produced neuronal damage, yet are administered by doctors to humans in the settings of pharmacotherapy and of anesthesia. They are named after John Olney, who conducted a study in 1989 to investigate neurotoxicity caused by PCP and related drugs. They are important for two reasons. Firstly, NMDA receptor antagonists are physician-prescribed drugs for therapeutic treatment of human diseases such as memantine for Alzheimer's disease and amantadine for Parkinson's disease, and also occur as street drugs that are taken recreationally. Secondly in the field of anesthesiology, the dissociative anesthesia of many general anesthetics is due to NMDA receptor antagonist properties. Because the neuronal vacuolation of Olney's lesions evolves into neuronal necrosis or death of neurons, it is important to determine whether Olney's lesions occur in humans, not only in experimental animals. The essential question is whether an NMDA receptor antagonist drug is to be considered a human neurotoxin or not. The patient safety implications for pharmacotherapy and for anesthesia would each be profound, if the answer is affirmative.

History
In 1989, Olney et al. discovered that neuronal vacuolation and other cytotoxic changes ("lesions") occurred in brains of rats administered NMDA antagonists, including PCP, MK-801 (dizocilpine) and ketamine.  Examination of neurons in the posterior cingulate and retrosplenial cortices by electron microscopy revealed apparent lytic breakdown of mitochondria in the large vacuoles which had become apparent 2 hours after administration of an NMDA antagonist.  After administration of 1.0 (mg/kg subcutaneously) MK-801 to rats, these neurotoxic changes became more apparent until about 12 hours post-dose, but the morphology of most cells appeared normal by light microscope about 24 hours post-dose.  With 10 (mg/kg sc) doses of MK-801, the vacuolation reaction was still visible by light microscope 48 hours post-dose.  After repeated doses of the NMDA antagonists MK-801 and PCP, the vacuolation reaction appeared consistent with the reaction after a single dose, so there was no evidence of a cumulative neurotoxic effect or that the reaction proceeded to an irreversible stage with repeated doses.  The lowest doses of ketamine and tiletamine that produced neurotoxic changes visible by light microscope 4 hours post dose were 40 (mg/kg sc) and 10 (mg/kg sc), respectively.  The potency of the drugs in producing these neurotoxic changes corresponded with their potency as NMDA antagonists: i.e. MK-801 > PCP > tiletamine > ketamine.

Researcher Roland N. Auer conducted similar studies to look at the correlation between age and sex and the development of NMDA receptor antagonist neurotoxicity in test rats. Older rats experienced a much higher mortality rate after the development of NAN. Female rats were found, at all ages, to have a higher incidence of necrotic (dead) neurons as a result of NAN.

Nitrous oxide, a common anesthetic for humans (especially in dentistry), has also been shown to cause vacuolization in rats' brains, but caused no irreversible lesions.

Dextromethorphan, a common antitussive often found in cough medicines, has been shown to cause vacuolization in rats' brains when administered at doses of 75 mg/(kg ip). However, oral administration of dextromethorphan hydrobromide (DXM HBr) to female rats in single doses as high as 120 mg/kg did not result in detectable neurotoxic changes at 4–6 hours or 24–26 hours post-dose (female rats are more sensitive to NMDA antagonist neurotoxicity).  The same researchers also found no evidence of neurotoxic changes in retrosplenial or cingulate cortices of male rats orally administered up to 400 mg/(kg day) DXM HBr or female rats orally administered 120 mg/(kg day) DXM HBr, both for 30 days.  Carliss et al. (2007) also found that rats administered 9 mg/(kg day sc) (+)-MK-801 hydrogen maleate for 30 days did produce detectable vacuolation as expected.  When 30 mg/(kg ip) dextrorphan was administered to male rats, neurotoxic changes were observed only 30 minutes post-dose.

Even if the hypothesis of gross neural apoptosis proves to be false in humans, NMDA antagonists certainly have potential to permanently alter synaptic structure due to effects upon long term potentiation, a process in which NMDA receptors plays a crucial role. Perhaps, with repeated usage, this would manifest, due to tolerance, thus downregulation, of the NMDA receptor system. This could feasibly alter the function/relationship of various structures, specifically the ventral visual stream, perhaps a cause of the anecdotal reports of hallucinogen persisting perception disorder (HPPD) from such chronic users of novel psychoactive substances.

In 1999 an autopsy study by Johannes Kornhuber of 8 patients who had received amantadine therapy looked at the selectively vulnerable brain regions where Olney's lesions occur, the cingulate and retrosplenial cortex, and found no evidence of Olney's lesions.

In 2013 a study using magnetic resonance imaging showed brain lesions in ketamine addicts (using from 0.2g twice a week up to 1g daily for 0.5 up to 12 years) with severity depending on the duration of addiction and daily intake of ketamine. Cortical atrophy and holes in superficial white matter are seen early on. After 4 years of addiction lesions spread throughout the brain and damage is evident in the pons and other deeper brain structures.

Prevention
In medical settings, NMDA receptor antagonists are used as anesthetics, so GABAA receptor positive allosteric modulators are used to effectively prevent any neurotoxicity caused by them.  Drugs that work to suppress NAN include anticholinergics, benzodiazepines, barbiturates and Alpha-adrenergic agonists, such as clonidine.
Conversely, coadministration of NMDA-antagonists with alpha-2 adrenergic antagonists, like yohimbine, could theoretically potentiate NAN.

Controversy
In Karl L. R. Jansen's book, Ketamine: Dreams and Realities, unpublished studies are cited on monkey brains. The opinion that DXM caused Olney's Lesions therefore came under fire. Jansen writes:

See also

 NMDA receptor
 NMDA receptor antagonist
 Dissociative
 Neurotoxic drug

References

External links
"Lycaeum" about NAN

Neurotrauma
Toxicology
Lesion

de:John W. Olney